"Im schwarzen Walfisch zu Askalon" ("In Ashkelon's Black Whale") is a popular academic commercium song. It was known as a beer-drinking song in many German speaking ancient universities. Joseph Victor von Scheffel provided the lyrics under the title Altassyrisch (Old Assyrian) 1854, the melody is from 1783 or earlier.

Content 
The lyrics reflect an endorsement of the bacchanalian mayhem of student life, similar as in Gaudeamus igitur. The song describes an old Assyrian drinking binge of a man in an inn with some references to the Classics. The desks are made of marble and the large invoice is being provided in cuneiform on bricks. However the carouser has to admit that he left his money already in Nineveh. A Nubian house servant kicks him out then and the song closes with the notion, that (compare John 4:44) a prophet has no honor in his own country, if he doesn't pay cash for his consumption.  Charles Godfrey Leland has translated the poems among other works of Scheffel. Each stanza begins with the naming verse "Im Schwarzen Walfisch zu Askalon", but varies the outcome. The "Im" is rather prolonged with the melody and increases the impact. Some of the stanzas:

Im schwarzen Wallfisch zu Ascalon

Da trank ein Mann drei Tag',

Bis dass er steif wie ein Besenstiel

Am Marmortische lag.

'In the Black Whale at Ascalon

A man drank day by day,

Till, stiff as any broom-handle,

Upon the floor he lay.

...

In the Black Whale at Ascalon

The waiters brought the bill,

In arrow-heads on six broad tiles

To him who thus did swill.

...

In the Black Whale at Ascalon

No prophet hath renown;

And he who there would drink in peace

Must pay the money down.

In typical manner of Scheffel, it contains an anachronistic mixture of various times and eras, parodistic notions on current science, as e.g. Historical criticism and interpretations of the Book of Jonah as a mere shipwrecking narrative. According to Scheffel, the guest didn't try to get back in the inn as „Aussi bini, aussi bleibi, wai Ascalun, ihr grobi Kaibi“ (I been out, I stay so, you rude Aschkelon calves). There are various additional verses, including political parodist ones and verses mocking different sorts of fraternities.
The song has been used as name for traditional inns and restaurants, e.g. in Heidelberg and Bad Säckingen. In Bad Säckingen the name was used on several (consecutive) inns and was namegiver for the still existing club "Walfisch Gesellschaft Säckingen" (Walfischia), honoring Scheffel.

Mathematics International 
There is one version just and only one for mathematics, called 'International'.
In ancient times, upon the door 
Of Plato, there was writt'n: 
“To each non-mathematicus 
The entrance is forbidd'n.
The same stanza is available in further 13 languages, including Greek (Μελαίνῃ τῇ ἐν Φαλαίνᾳ - Melaínē (black) tē (the) en (in) Phalaína (whale)) and Volapük, which are sung one after the other.

Further reading  
 Manfred Fuhrmann: Scheffels Erzählwerk: Bildungsbeflissenheit, Deutschtümelei. In dsb., Europas fremd gewordene Fundamente. Aktuelles zu Themen aus der Antike. Artemis und Winkler, Zürich 1995 
 Udo Kindermann: Der Dichter Scheffel, der Mineraloge Kobell und der Industrielle Zugmayer und Scheffels "Petrefaktisch Lied". In: Josef Victor von Scheffel zum 100. Todestag am 9. April 1986. Karlsruhe 1986, pp. 25–43
 Heinz Linnerz: Das Trinklied in der deutschen Dichtung von Johann Hermann Schein bis Viktor von Scheffel. Diss. phil. [masch.], Universität Köln 1952

References

External links 
 Lyrics including a latin version
 Lyrics and melody on a large German fraternity wiki 
 folk version traditional

Commercium songs
Ashkelon
Nineveh Governorate
Jonah
Mathematics and culture